Kabin Buri is a district (amphoe) in the southeastern part of Prachinburi province, eastern Thailand.

History
Mueang Kabin Buri was an ancient city of the Ayutthaya kingdom. The city hall was in Ban Hanuman. In 1906 the city hall was moved to Ban Paknam, the area where the Hanuman and Phra Prong Rivers join to become the Bang Pakong River. On 1 April 1926 the province was abolished and the two districts, Mueang Kabin Buri and Aranyapathret, became districts of Prachinburi Province.

Geography
Neighboring districts are (from the west clockwise): Si Maha Phot, Prachantakham, Na Di of Prachinburi Province; Mueang Sa Kaeo and Khao Chakan of Sa Kaeo province; and Sanam Chai Khet of Chachoengsao province.

The important water resources are the Hanuman, Phra Prong, and Bang Pakong Rivers.

Climate

Highways
 

  Highway 304 passes through Kabin Buri from Nonthaburi to Korat.  
   Highway 33 passes through north side of Kabin Buri from Saraburi to Aranyaprathet.
 Highway 359 passes through the south side of the district connecting Highways 304 to Highway 33 and Highway 317.

Administration
The district is divided into 14 sub-districts (tambons), which are further subdivided into 192 villages (mubans). There are three townships (thesaban tambons): Kabin covers parts of tambon Kabin, Mueang Kao covers parts of tambons Mueang Kao and Kabin, and Sa Bua parts of tambon Lat Takhian. There are a further 14 tambon administrative organizations (TAO).

References

External links
amphoe.com

Kabin Buri